Borj-e Seyfollah (also Romanized as Borj-e Seyfollāh) is a village in Meshkan Rural District, Poshtkuh District, Neyriz County, Fars Province, Iran. At the 2006 census, its population was 10, in 4 families.

References 

Populated places in Neyriz County